Horicon is a city in Dodge County, Wisconsin, United States. The population was 3,655 at the 2010 census.

Geography
Horicon is located at  (43.4482, -88.6329).

The city is situated at the southernmost tip of the Horicon Marsh. Tourists flock to the area every year to see the migration of the Canada geese.

Demographics

2010 census
As of the census of 2010, there were 3,655 people, 1,497 households, and 1,006 families living in the city. The racial makeup of the city was 95.7% White, 0.4% African American, 0.1% Native American, 0.7% Asian, 1.6% from other races, and 1.5% from two or more races. Hispanic or Latino of any race were 4.1% of the population.

There were 1,497 households, of which 31.5% had children under the age of 18 living with them, 53.3% were married couples living together, 9.2% had a female householder with no husband present, 4.7% had a male householder with no wife present, and 32.8% were non-families. 27.0% of all households were made up of individuals, and 9.5% had someone living alone who was 65 years of age or older. The average household size was 2.42 and the average family size was 2.94.

The median age in the city was 38.7 years. 24.2% of residents were under the age of 18; 7.9% were between the ages of 18 and 24; 26.7% were from 25 to 44; 27.9% were from 45 to 64; and 13.4% were 65 years of age or older. The gender makeup of the city was 50.1% male and 49.9% female.

2000 census
As of the census of 2000, there were 3,775 people, 1,474 households, and 1,037 families living in the city. The population density was 1,126.8 people per square mile (435.1/km2). There were 1,584 housing units at an average density of 472.8 per square mile (182.6/km2). The racial makeup of the city was 97.59% White, 0.40% African American, 0.19% Native American, 0.19% Asian, 0.08% Pacific Islander, 1.03% from other races, and 0.53% from two or more races. 2.09% of the population were Hispanic or Latino of any race.

There were 1,474 households, out of which 34.8% had children under the age of 18 living with them, 58.5% were married couples living together, 7.7% had a female householder with no husband present, and 29.6% were non-families. 25.4% of all households were made up of individuals, and 10.5% had someone living alone who was 65 years of age or older. The average household size was 2.56 and the average family size was 3.06.

In the city, the population was spread out, with 26.6% under the age of 18, 8.5% from 18 to 24, 30.3% from 25 to 44, 22.0% from 45 to 64, and 12.7% who were 65 years of age or older. The median age was 36 years. For every 100 females, there were 98.6 males. For every 100 females age 18 and over, there were 97.3 males.

The median income for a household in the city was $50,577, and the median income for a family was $58,393. Males had a median income of $38,008 versus $26,278 for females. The per capita income for the city was $21,690. 2.1% of the population and 0.6% of families were below the poverty line. Out of the total population, 1.6% of those under the age of 18 and 0.4% of those 65 and older were living below the poverty line.

Economy

Horicon is home of the John Deere Horicon Works, which produces lawn and garden tractors, golf and turf reel mowers, and utility vehicles. Daniel Van Brunt, the inventor of the grain-drill and founder of what became John Deere Horicon Works, also founded Horicon Bank in 1896.

The Dodge County Pionier took over the Horicon Reporter in 2009 to cover news in Horicon and the surrounding area.

Education
The School District of Horicon serves the area. It consists of Van Brunt Elementary School and Horicon High School, whose mascot is the Marshmen.

Horicon Public Library
The Horicon Public Library is a member of the Mid-Wisconsin Federated Library System (MWFLS) and is in the Trio consortium, which shares materials with various other public and school libraries throughout Dodge, Jefferson, and Washington Counties in southeastern Wisconsin.
The small-town evaluation program "First Impressions," a program for community assessment and improvement, in 2009, stated that the Horicon Public Library was "outstanding."

Notable people
 Hiram Barber, businessman and politician
 Hiram Barber, Jr, U.S. Representative from Illinois
 Satterlee Clark, Jr, member of the Wisconsin State Assembly and Wisconsin State Senator
 Charles Hawks, Jr., U.S. Representative
 S. H. Hays, Idaho politician
 James B. Hays, attorney, politician, and jurist in Wisconsin and the Idaho Territory
 Charles A. Kading, U.S. Representative
 Adrian Karsten, ESPN reporter
Esther Doughty Luckhardt, member of the Wisconsin State Assembly
 William H. Markham, member of the Wisconsin State Senator
Bradley Phillips, member of the Wisconsin State Assembly
Theodore Schroeder, lawyer and writer
Fran Ulmer, Alaskan politician.

Images

References

External links

 City of Horicon
 Horicon Chamber of Commerce
 Sanborn fire insurance maps: 1894 1904 1913

Cities in Wisconsin
Cities in Dodge County, Wisconsin